There have been a number of economic arguments advanced regarding evaluation of the benefits of biodiversity. Most are anthropocentric but economists have also debated whether biodiversity is inherently valuable, independent of benefits to humanity.

Diverse ecosystems are typically more productive than non-diverse ones, because any set of species can never fully exploit all potential niches. Since human economic productivity is largely reliant on Earth's ecosystems, adequate bioproductivity needs to be maintained.

The wealth of natural innovation found in biological organisms rivals all known technologies derived through synthetic means.  A single human genome has some three billion bits of information but the human species also has many variations.  There are many millions of species of life on the planet each with valuable information. Many chemical formulae and forty-five percent of all drugs have bio-origin . In the long run keeping genetic records of all species could, however, be just as useful in this regard.

Some of the important economic commodities that biodiversity supplies to humankind are:

Food

Biodiversity provides high variety of food: crops, livestock, forestry, and fish are important food source of human species.
However, the number of species have been domesticated and cultivated are small if comparing with the number of species existing.
Wild species and varieties can supply genes for improving domesticated species by improving their yield, disease resistance, tolerance and vigor; this can increase the profit of farming.

Biological pest control

Using control species is often considered as more environmentally friendly method with compared with using pesticides. The control species can be used to protect the crops against pests and weeds. The economic loss due to the loss of crops/food can be reduced with the use of the control species.

Also, the population of disease vectors (for example, mosquitoes) and the invasive species can be controlled; thus, the economic loss led by the invasive species and vectors can be reduced.

However, even with extensive research into the control species, their use is a risky business, as in the importation of the cane toad to control beetles in Queensland.

Medication

A wide variety of plants, animals and fungi are used as medicine. Wild plant species have been used for medicinal purposes since before the beginning of recorded history. Over 60% of world population depends on the plant medicines for their primary health care. For example, quinine comes from the cinchona tree has been used to treat malaria, digitalis from the foxglove plant treats chronic heart trouble, and morphine from the poppy plant gives pain relief.

According to the National Cancer Institute, over 70% of the promising anti-cancer drugs come from plants in the tropical rainforests. It is estimated that of the 250,000 known plant species, only 5,000 have been researched for possible medical applications.  Ethnopharmacy is the branch of science that investigates traditional medicines.

Animals may also play a role, in particular in research. In traditional remedies, animals are extensively used as drugs. Many animals also medicate themselves. Zoopharmacognosy is the study of how animals use plants, insects and other inorganic materials in self-medicatation. In an interview with the late Neil Campbell,  Eloy Rodriguez describes the importance of biodiversity:

"Some of the compounds we've identified by zoopharmacognosy kill parasitic worms, and some of these chemicals may be useful against tumors. There is no question that the templates for most drugs are in the natural world."

Industry
For example, fibers for clothing, wood for shelter and warmth. Biodiversity may be a source of energy (such as biomass). Other industrial products are oils, lubricants, perfumes, fragrances, dyes, paper, waxes, rubber, latexes, resins, poisons, and cork, which can all be derived from various plant species. Supplies from animal origin include wool, silk, fur, leather, lubricants, and waxes.

Animals may also be used as a mode of transport.

Biological material can provide models for many industrial materials and structures. For example, the inspiration for the infrared sensor came from the thermosensitive pit organ of rattlesnake. The modelling is considered as Biomimicry.

Recreational harvesting
Various animals are harvested for display and as pet; many species of plants are harvested for personal and private gardening.

In Britain alone, some 65,000 species are sold for horticulture.  It has been suggested that this form of ex-situ conservation may be the most practical form in the future.

Tourism and recreation

Biodiversity is a source of economic wealth for many regions of the world, such as many nature reserves, parks and forests, where wildlife and plants are sources of beauty and joy for many people. Ecotourism, in particular, is a growing outdoor recreational activity. In 1988, it is estimated that 157-236 million people took part in ecotourism.   The majority of species have yet to be evaluated for their current or future economic importance. All the raw materials , pharmaceuticals and drug [production]]s all directly and indirectly depend upon biodiversity.

See also

 Biodiversity Action Plan
 Biodiversity finance/The Economics of Ecosystems and Biodiversity
 Environmental economics
 Endangered Species Recovery Plan

References

External links 

 Final Report - The Economics of Biodiversity: The Dasgupta Review

Biodiversity
Economics of sustainability